Kasenyi Airport  is an airport in Uganda. It is one of the forty six airports in the country.

Location
The geographic coordinates of this airport are not known because the airport does not appear on most publicly available maps, as of January 2010. The airport has a single unpaved runway whose exact measurements are unknown at this time. The airport is situated on the eastern shores of Lake George, in Queen Elizabeth National Park.

Overview
Kasenyi Airport is a small civilian airport that serves the area of Kasenyi and the neighboring areas of Queen Elizabeth National Park. As of January 2010, the airport is not yet under the administration of the Uganda Civil Aviation Authority.

See also
 Kasenyi
 Queen Elizabeth National Park
 Civil Aviation Authority of Uganda
Transport in Uganda
 List of airports in Uganda

References

External links
 Uganda Civil Aviation Authority Homepage

Airports in Uganda
Kasese District